The Mrs. J. V. Murphy House at 204 E. Santa Rosa in Victoria, Texas was built in 1899–1900.  It was designed by architect Jules Leffland.  It was listed on the National Register of Historic Places in 1986.

It is a large -story house with Queen Anne elements.  It has a stair turret and a wrap-around porch.  A tower top was never rebuilt after it was destroyed by a storm in the early 1900s.

It was listed on the NRHP as part of a study which listed numerous historic resources in the Victoria area, including other "complex and inventive Queen Anne dwellings" created by Leffland and other architects in the 1890s.

See also

National Register of Historic Places listings in Victoria County, Texas

References

Houses completed in 1900
Houses in Victoria, Texas
Houses on the National Register of Historic Places in Texas
Victorian architecture in Texas
Queen Anne architecture in Texas
National Register of Historic Places in Victoria, Texas